Bric del Terma is a mountain in Liguria, northern Italy, part of the Ligurian Apennines. It is located in the provinces of Genoa and Alessandria.

References

Mountains of Liguria
Mountains of Piedmont
Mountains under 1000 metres
Mountains of the Apennines